Eudora (minor planet designation: 217 Eudora) is a large Main belt asteroid. It was discovered by French (Corsican) astronomer J. Coggia on August 30, 1880, in Marseilles, France. It was his fourth asteroid discovery and is named after Eudora, a Hyad in Greek mythology.

It probably has a composition similar to carbonaceous chondrites. In 2007, a study showed it rotates every 25.253 ± 0.003 hours, based on lightcurve data. A light curve generated from photometric observations at Pulkovo Observatory, give a matching rotation period of 25.253 ± 0.002 hours and a brightness variation of 0.22 ± 0.04 in magnitude.

See also
List of minor planets: 1–1000

References

External links
 The Asteroid Orbital Elements Database
 Minor Planet Discovery Circumstances
 Asteroid Lightcurve Data File
 
 

Background asteroids
Eudora
Eudora
X-type asteroids (Tholen)
18800830